Fritz Vanderstuyft (born 22 September 1854, Ypres -- died September 1922, Ostend) was a professional Belgian racing cyclist from 1893 to 1899. He took part in several championship events, notably the Paris-Roubaix in 1896. His sons Arthur and Léon were also professional bicycle racers.

Victories

1896
Sixteenth Paris-Roubaix
1898
Eigteenth Paris-Roubaix
1899
Third Belgian Road Racing Championship
Thirteenth Paris-Roubaix

Notes

1854 births
1922 deaths
Belgian male cyclists
Sportspeople from Ypres
Cyclists from West Flanders